Zuzana Geislerová (born 14 March 1952) is a Czech actress known to United States audiences for her role as the Reverend Mother Gaius Helen Mohiam in the Sci Fi Channel's 2000 miniseries Frank Herbert's Dune and its 2003 sequel, Frank Herbert's Children of Dune.

Geislerová studied at the Theatre Faculty of the Academy of Performing Arts in Prague.

References

External links
 

Living people
Czech film actresses
Czech television actresses
1952 births
Actresses from Prague
20th-century Czech actresses
21st-century Czech actresses